Partula leucothoe is a species of air-breathing tropical land snail, a terrestrial pulmonate gastropod mollusk in the family Partulidae. This species is endemic to Palau.

References

L
Endemic fauna of Palau
Molluscs of Oceania
Molluscs of the Pacific Ocean
Critically endangered fauna of Oceania
Gastropods described in 1865
Taxonomy articles created by Polbot
Taxobox binomials not recognized by IUCN